Nesoptilotis is a genus of honeyeaters endemic to Australia and Tasmania. The genus consists of two former members of Lichenostomus, and was created after a molecular phylogenetic analysis published in 2011 showed that the original genus was polyphyletic.

The genus contains two species:

The name Nesoptilotis was first proposed by the Australian ornithologist Gregory Mathews in 1913. The word is derived from the Greek nēsos island (i.e. Tasmania),  feather and -ōtis eared.

References

 
Bird genera